George Lawrence Puccinelli (June 22, 1907 – April 16, 1956) was an outfielder in Major League Baseball. He played for the St. Louis Cardinals, St. Louis Browns, and Philadelphia Athletics.

In 187 games over four seasons, Puccinelli posted a .283 batting average (172-for-607) with 109 runs, 19 home runs, 102 RBI and 78 bases on balls. He recorded a .947 fielding percentage playing at right and left field.  

On April 16, 1956, at age 48, he suffered a fatal heart attack while playing golf.

References

External links

1907 births
1956 deaths
Baseball players from San Francisco
Baltimore Orioles (IL) players
Dallas Rebels players
Danville Veterans players
Denver Bears players
Dubuque Dubs players
Fort Wayne Chiefs players
Hollywood Stars players
Houston Buffaloes players
International League MVP award winners
Major League Baseball outfielders
Newark Bears (IL) players
Philadelphia Athletics players
Rochester Red Wings players
St. Louis Cardinals players
St. Louis Browns players